Georges Gardebois (18 September 1907 – 23 August 1977) was a French boxer. He competed in the men's heavyweight event at the 1928 Summer Olympics.

References

1907 births
1977 deaths
French male boxers
Olympic boxers of France
Boxers at the 1928 Summer Olympics
Place of birth missing
Heavyweight boxers